Ellipsoptera hirtilabris, the moustached tiger beetle, is a species of flashy tiger beetle in the family Carabidae.  It is found in North America.

References

 Riley K, Browne R (2011). "Changes in ground beetle diversity and community composition in age structured forests (Coleoptera, Carabidae)". ZooKeys 147: 601–621.

Further reading

 Arnett, R. H. Jr., and M. C. Thomas. (eds.). (21 December 2000) American Beetles, Volume I: Archostemata, Myxophaga, Adephaga, Polyphaga: Staphyliniformia. CRC Press LLC, Boca Raton, Florida. 
 
 Richard E. White. (1983). Peterson Field Guides: Beetles. Houghton Mifflin Company.

Cicindelidae
Beetles of North America
Beetles described in 1875